At least six ships of the Royal Navy have borne the name HMS Sprightly:

  was a 12 gun cutter built in Dover in August 1777, that sank 23 December 1777 off Guernsey
  was a 10-gun cutter that the  captured in the Mediterranean Sea in 1801, and subsequently scuttled.
  was the hired armed cutter Lively, launched in 1805, that served the Royal Navy in August 1805. The Navy purchased her in 1805 and renamed her. As Sprightly she served until she was broke up in 1815.
  was a 6-gun  built for the Royal Navy. Wrecked off the Isle of Portland in 1821.
  was a tender in service 1837-69, formerly a Post Office packet ship built in 1823.
  was a  torpedo boat destroyer, launched in 1900 and scrapped in 1920
 HMS Sprightly (P268) was an S-class submarine, ordered in 1943 but cancelled because of the end of World War II

See also
 , Royal Australian Navy tugboat
 HM Revenue Cutter Sprightly, which wrecked on the Isle of Portland on 8 January 1821

Royal Navy ship names